Séamus Mac Mathúna (born 1945) is an Irish language and Irish literature scholar and university professor.

Biography
Séamus Mac Mathúna was born in Belfast in 1945 where he attended St. Mary's Christian Brothers' Grammar School, Belfast. He then attended Queen's University Belfast where he obtained a B.A. (Hons) in Celtic Studies. This was followed by post-graduate research into Indo-European, Old Norse and Linguistics at the University of Zürich and the University of Iceland, Reykjavík. He was awarded a Ph.D. in Celtic Studies by Queen's University Belfast.

In 1970, he was appointed to a Lectureship in Celtic Languages and Literatures at the University of Uppsala, Sweden.  He then moved to a Statutory Lecturer in Modern Irish at University College, Galway in 1976. In 1980, was appointed Professor of Irish at Ulster University from which he retired in 2014.

Research
He has conducted research into Early Irish language and literature; Irish folklore; the syntax, semantics and lexicon of Irish; and Celtic links with Nordic, Slavic and Germanic cultures.

Awards
 Member of the Royal Irish Academy (Vice-president 2009–13) 
 Corresponding Member of the Austrian Academy of Sciences
 President of Societas Celto-Slavica
 Joint General Editor of the society's journal, Studia Celto-Slavica.

Publications
These are detailed in the Bibliography of Irish Linguistics and Literature at the Dublin Institute for Advanced Studies.

 Mac Mathúna, S. (1985). Immram Brain: Bran's Journey to the Land of the Women 
 Mac Mathúna, S. (1995). Collins Gem Irish Dictionary
 Ó Corráin, A., & Mac Mathúna, S. (1997). Collins Pocket Irish Dictionary
 Mac Mathúna, S. (2007). On the Definite Article and Definite Descriptions in Irish 
 Mac Mathúna, S., & Corrain, A. (eds) (1997). Miscellanea Celtica in Memoriam Heinrich Wagner
 Mac Mathúna, S. (2006). Parallels between Celtic and Slavic
 Mac Mathúna, S. (2012). Ireland and Armenia: Studies in Language, History and Narrative 
 Borsje, M., Dooley, A., Mac Mathúna, S., & Toner. G. (eds) (2014). Celtic Cosmology. Perspectives from Ireland and Scotland. Toronto: Pontifical Institute of Mediaeval Studies.

A Festschrift in his honour was presented to him on his 75th birthday and launched at the 17th International Symposium of Societas Celtologica Nordica held in Uppsala on 7–10 May 2020.

References

People educated at St. Mary's Christian Brothers' Grammar School, Belfast
Alumni of Queen's University Belfast
Academics of Ulster University
Members of the Royal Irish Academy
Irish lexicographers
Translators from Irish
Celtic studies scholars
1945 births
Living people